Waaris may refer to:

 Waaris (2016 TV series)
 Waaris (2008 Zee TV series), a drama-series appearing on the Indian satellite television network Zee TV
 Waaris (1999 Zee TV series), a serial that aired on the Indian satellite television network Zee TV in 1999
 Waris (TV series), a drama series which aired on Pakistani channel PTV in early 1980s
 Waaris (1954 film), a Hindi film, with music by Anil Biswas
 Waaris (1988 film), a Hindi film that released in 1988
 Waaris Shah - Ishq Da Waaris, a Punjabi film, an official entry of India for Academy Awards, The Oscars.
 Waris Shah, a Punjabi Sufi poet